The Constitution Alteration (Railways Disputes) Bill 1912 was an unsuccessful referendum held in 1913 that sought to alter the Australian Constitution to give the Commonwealth legislative power over industrial relations in the state railway services.
The question was put to a referendum in the 1913 Australian referendum.

Question
Do you approve of the proposed law for the alteration of the Constitution entitled 'Constitution Alteration (Railway Disputes) 1912'?

The proposal was to alter the text of section 51 of the Constitution to read as follows:
51. The Parliament shall, subject to this Constitution, have Legislative power to make laws for the peace, order, and good government of the Commonwealth with respect to:
(xxxv.A.) Conciliation and arbitration for prevention and settlement of industrial disputes in relation to employment in the railway service of a State.

Results
The referendum was not approved by a majority of voters, and a majority of the voters was achieved in only three states.

Discussion
The 1911 referendum asked a single question that dealt with trade and commerce, corporations and industrial matters.  This was an additional resolution that went beyond the previous proposal to directly address industrial disputes in the state railways. Like its forebear, none of these resolutions were carried. On each of the many occasions a similar question was asked at a referendum the public decided not to vest power in the Commonwealth over these matters.

1911 referendum on trade and commerce

See also
Politics of Australia
History of Australia

References

Further reading
 Standing Committee on Legislative and Constitutional Affairs (1997) Constitutional Change: Select sources on Constitutional change in Australia 1901–1997. Australian Government Printing Service, Canberra.
 Bennett, Scott (2003). Research Paper no. 11 2002–03: The Politics of Constitutional Amendment Australian Department of the Parliamentary Library, Canberra.
 Australian Electoral Commission (2007) Referendum Dates and Results 1906 – Present AEC, Canberra.

Referendem (Railway Disputes)
1913 referendums
1913 (Railway Disputes)